David Dreyer (born May 14, 1974) is a member of the Georgia House of Representatives and a member of the Democratic Party representing the House District 59.

Personal life and education 
Dreyer was born in Ringgold, Georgia and attended middle school in Roswell. He received a degree in Political Science and Religious Studies at Georgia State University in 2001. Later, Dreyer graduated from Emory University School of Law in 2004 after focusing on constitutional law and voter protection.

Career 
Dreyer is a partner at Dreyer Sterling LLC, a law firm practicing in the areas of trial and litigation.

Dreyer was first elected to the Georgia House of Representatives in 2016. He currently serves on the Higher Education, Judiciary, and Science and Technology committees in the Georgia House.

In 2019, Dreyer represented State Senator Nikema Williams after she had been arrested during a protest over counting votes for the 2018 Georgia gubernatorial election.

References 

Democratic Party members of the Georgia House of Representatives
Living people
People from Ringgold, Georgia
Georgia State University alumni
Emory University School of Law alumni
21st-century American politicians
1974 births